In projective geometry, a dual curve of a given plane curve  is a curve in the dual projective plane consisting of the set of lines tangent to . There is a map from a curve to its dual, sending each point to the point dual to its tangent line. If  is algebraic then so is its dual and the degree of the dual is known as the class of the original curve.

The construction of the dual curve is the geometrical underpinning for the Legendre transformation in the context of Hamiltonian mechanics.

Equations
Let  be the equation of a curve in homogeneous coordinates on the projective plane. Let  be the equation of a line, with  being designated its line coordinatesin a dual projective plane. The condition that the line is tangent to the curve can be expressed in the form  which is the tangential equation of the curve.

So  is a tangent to the curve if

For example, let  be the conic .

Clearing  from the denominators, the equation of the dual is

Consider a parametrically defined curve  in projective coordinates . Its projective tangent line is a linear plane spanned by the point of tangency and the tangent vector, with linear equation coefficients given by the cross product:which in affine coordinates  is:

The dual of an inflection point will give a cusp and two points sharing the same tangent line will give a self-intersection point on the dual. 

From the projective description, one may compute the dual of the dual:which is projectively equivalent to the original curve .

Properties of dual curve
Properties of the original curve correspond to dual properties on the dual curve. In the Introduction image, the red curve has three singularities – a node in the center, and two cusps at the lower right and lower left. The black curve has no singularities but has four distinguished points: the two top-most points correspond to the node (double point), as they both have the same tangent line, hence map to the same point in the dual curve, while the two inflection points correspond to the cusps, since the tangent lines first go one way then the other (slope increasing, then decreasing).

By contrast, on a smooth, convex curve the angle of the tangent line changes monotonically, and the resulting dual curve is also smooth and convex.

Further, both curves above have a reflectional symmetry: projective duality preserves symmetries a projective space, so dual curves have the same symmetry group. In this case both symmetries are realized as a left-right reflection; this is an artifact of how the space and the dual space have been identified – in general these are symmetries of different spaces.

Degree
If  is a plane algebraic curve, then the degree of the dual is the number of points intersection with a line in the dual plane. Since a line in the dual plane corresponds to a point in the plane, the degree of the dual is the number of tangents to the  that can be drawn through a given point. The points where these tangents touch the curve are the points of intersection between the curve and the polar curve with respect to the given point.

The dual of a line (a curve of degree 1) is an exception to this and is taken to be a point in the dual space (namely the original line). The dual of a single point is taken to be the collection of lines though the point; this forms a line in the dual space which corresponds to the original point.

If  is smooth (no singular points) then the dual of  has maximum degree . This implies the dual of a conic is also a conic. Geometrically, the map from a conic to its dual is one-to-one (since no line is tangent to two points of a conic, as that requires degree 4), and the tangent line varies smoothly (as the curve is convex, so the slope of the tangent line changes monotonically: cusps in the dual require an inflection point in the original curve, which requires degree 3).

For curves with singular points, these points will also lie on the intersection of the curve and its polar and this reduces the number of possible tangent lines.

Polar reciprocal
The dual can be visualized as a locus in the plane in the form of the polar reciprocal. This is defined with reference to a fixed conic  as the locus of the poles of the tangent lines of the curve .

Generalizations

Higher dimensions
Similarly, generalizing to higher dimensions, given a hypersurface, the tangent space at each point gives a family of hyperplanes, and thus defines a dual hypersurface in the dual space.

Examples

which lands in the dual projective space.
 The dual variety of a point  is the hyperplane

Dual polygon

The dual curve construction works even if the curve is piecewise linear or piecewise differentiable, but the resulting map is degenerate (if there are linear components) or ill-defined (if there are singular points).

In the case of a polygon, all points on each edge share the same tangent line, and thus map to the same vertex of the dual, while the tangent line of a vertex is ill-defined, and can be interpreted as all the lines passing through it with angle between the two edges. This accords both with projective duality (lines map to points, and points to lines), and with the limit of smooth curves with no linear component: as a curve flattens to an edge, its tangent lines map to closer and closer points; as a curve sharpens to a vertex, its tangent lines spread further apart.

More generally, any convex polyhedron or cone has a polyhedral dual, and any convex set X with boundary hypersurface H has a convex conjugate X* whose boundary is the dual variety H*.

See also
Hough transform
Gauss map

Notes

References
 

 
 
 

Curves
Projective geometry
Differential geometry